Charles Stewart (28 July 1778 – 6 November 1869) was an officer in the United States Navy who commanded a number of US Navy ships, including . He saw service during the Quasi War and both Barbary Wars in the Mediterranean along North Africa and the War of 1812. He later commanded the navy yard in Philadelphia and was promoted to become the Navy's first flag officer shortly before retiring.  He was promoted to rear admiral after he retired from the Navy.  He lived a long life and was the last surviving Navy captain who had served in the War of 1812.

Early life
On 28 July 1778, Stewart was born in Philadelphia, Pennsylvania, to Charles and Sarah Harding (née Ford) Stewart, Scots-Irish immigrants from Belfast, only a month after the British evacuated the city. His father died in 1780, leaving his mother little means to support him and his three siblings. She later remarried a former bodyguard of General Washington. Stewart attended Dr. Abercrombie's Episcopal Academy in Philadelphia where he met Stephen Decatur and Richard Somers. He went to sea at the age of thirteen as a cabin boy and rose through the grades to become master of a merchantman.

Early naval service
During the Quasi-War with France, Stewart was one of the first officers in the rebirth of the United States Navy. At the age of nineteen, he was commissioned a lieutenant on 9 March 1798 and joined the frigate , under the command of John Barry, as fourth lieutenant for a cruise in the West Indies to restrain French privateers. Stewart was in charge of the ship's outfitting and recruiting of crew.

On 16 July 1800 he assumed command of the schooner  and captured two armed French vessels and recapturing several American ships. While anchored at the island of Dominica for water, he secured the release of an American impressed on a British warship. He later rescued approximately seventy people, mostly women and children from a vessel in distress at a reef near Saona Island, just before the schooner sank, for which the Governor of Santo Domingo sent a letter of thanks to President Jefferson.

He was promoted to master-commandant on 19 May 1804. There, he participated in the destruction of  after her capture by Tripoli, helped to maintain the blockade of Tripoli, and distinguished himself in assaults on the enemy in August and September 1804. After the First Barbary War, he participated in a show of force at Tunis. He was second in command to Preble from 1803 through 1805. He was promoted to the rank of captain on 22 April 1806 and returned home on leave from US Navy, joining the merchant fleet, where he remained until the late 1811.

War of 1812

Since Constellation was closely blockaded in Norfolk by the British, he took command of Constitution ("Old Ironsides") at Boston on 18 July 1813. He made two brilliant cruises in her between 1813 and 1815.

The Treaty of Ghent had been ratified by the United States government three days earlier but both sides in the battle were unaware of that event. By capturing two British warships with a single ship of his own, Stewart became a national hero and was awarded a Congressional Gold Medal on 22 February 1816. He was also admitted as an honorary member of the Pennsylvania Society of the Cincinnati in the same year.

Postwar career
Stewart's later service included command of the American Mediterranean squadron from 1816 to 1820 and of one in the Pacific from 1820 to 1824.  For South American patriots fighting for their independence, commodore Stewart's conduct in Peruvian waters was controversial because, claiming "neutral rights" for U.S. merchants, he escorted their ships through a patriot blockade to trade with Spanish royalists.  His flagship, the USS Franklin, also transported a Spanish spy. (Stewart said he was unaware the Spaniard was on his ship, and he blamed his wife for secreting the man on board.)  For these and other actions, the U.S. Navy subjected Stewart to a highly publicized court-martial upon return to the United States.  Stewart's wife refused to testify in his defense, and they soon divorced.  Stewart biographers Berube and Rodgaard concluded about his trial that, “the Navy desperately needed a not-guilty verdict as several of its senior-most captains faced courts-martial in the summer of 1825.”  A board of twelve of Stewart's fellow officers found him not guilty.

Stewart served as a Naval Commissioner from 1830 to 1832.

In 1836 Stewart saw service in the West Indies and commanded a vessel that captured a Portuguese slaver ship as it came into Havana. Before Stewart's boarding crew took control of the ship, the commander of the vessel jumped overboard, swam ashore and escaped. On board the captured ship were 250 surviving negro children, many others having died from lack of water during the voyage. Outraged at the conditions and health of the children Stewart informed British commissioner Kennedy in Havana of the dire situation.

In the later years of his career, Stewart commanded the Philadelphia Navy Yard from 1838 to 1841, in 1846, and again from 1853 to 1861.

Senior officer
Upon the death of Captain James Barron in 1851, Stewart became the most senior ranking officer in the Navy.  By a joint resolution passed on 2 March 1859, Congress made Stewart "senior flag officer" on 22 April 1859, a rank created for him in recognition of his distinguished and meritorious service.

Stewart was placed on the retired list on 21 December 1861 after serving 63 years in the Navy.  His age at the time of his retirement was 83 years, 4 months and 24 days – making him the second oldest officer on active duty in the history of the U.S. Navy (after William D. Leahy).  He was promoted to rear admiral on the retired list on 16 July 1862.  Stewart holds the all time records for the longest active duty career and longest time holding a single rank on active duty (52 years 10 months).

Shortly before his death, Stewart was elected a companion of the Pennsylvania Commandery of the Military Order of the Loyal Legion of the United States – a military society of officers who had served the Union during the Civil War.  He was assigned the Society's insignia number 1119.

Stewart died at Bordentown, New Jersey on 6 November 1869 at the age of 91.  He was buried at Woodlands Cemetery in Philadelphia.

Dates of rank
Lieutenant, USN – 9 March 1798
Captain, USN – 22 April 1806
Senior Flag Officer, USN – 2 March 1859
Retired List – 21 December 1861
Rear Admiral, USN (Retired) – 16 July 1862

Personal life and legacy
He first married Delia Tudor. His grandchildren, by their daughter Delia Tudor Stewart Parnell (1816–1918) and John Henry Parnell, included Charles Stewart Parnell, a prominent Irish political leader who fought for Irish home rule until his death in 1891, and Anna Parnell and Fanny Parnell, Irish nationalists who co-founded the Ladies' Land League in 1880 to raise money in America for the Land League.

Secondly he married Margaretta W. Smith. Their daughter Julia Smith Stewart (1834–1910) married Harry Laguerenne, the son of Eliza Beauveau and Pierre Louis Laguerenne. He was a wine and spirits importer in Philadelphia.

Several of Stewart's nephews served in the Navy, including Commodore Charles Stewart McCauley.

Charles Stewart was buried beneath an obelisk at Woodland Cemetery in Philadelphia.

In the late 19th century, his estate became the site of the Bordentown School, a residential high school academic and vocational training program.

Two U.S. Navy destroyers, DD-13 and DD-224, and one destroyer escort, DE-238, have been named in Stewart's honor.

See also
Bibliography of early American naval history

References

Bibliography
 Url
Url
 Url
 Url
 – Url
 Url

Further reading
Smethurst, David. Tripoli: The United States' First War On Terror. New York: Presidio Press, 2007. .

External links
 Appleton's Cyclopaedia of American Biography, Vol. V, pp. 685-6, "STEWART, Charles, naval officer,..." by Wilson, James Grant, 1832–1914; Fiske, John, 1842–1901.
 Letter of Don Joaquin Garcia, Governor of Santo Domingo to Pres. Thomas Jefferson commending Lt Stewart for his rescue of persons from a reef off Saona Island

1778 births
1869 deaths
American people of Scotch-Irish descent
People from Bordentown, New Jersey
18th-century American naval officers
19th-century American naval officers
United States Navy commodores
American military personnel of the Quasi-War
American military personnel of the First Barbary War
United States Navy personnel of the War of 1812
Congressional Gold Medal recipients
Burials at The Woodlands Cemetery
Commanders of the USS Constitution
Military personnel from New Jersey